A racecard is a printed card used in horse racing giving information about races, principally the horses running in each particular race. Racecards are often given in newspapers. Also known as a race book, which in this case is a small booklet issued for use at a race meeting.

A typical racecard lists information not only about the horse's name, but also its age and the weight it has to carry in the race. The rider and trainer are listed, plus figures indicating the horse's recent form.

Race 
Race name
Time of race
Prize money
Distance 	
Going
gd - good going
g/f - good to firm
fm - firm
g/s - good to soft
sft - soft going
hvy - heavy going
ap - all weather - polytrack
af - all weather - fibresand

Status of race - the premier races are Class 1 (Flat racing) and Grade 1 (National Hunt racing)
Number of runners

Individual horses 
Position drawn in stalls
Number horse is wearing ('Saddle cloth number')
Form figures and previous races
Previous season's races are shown before a hyphen (-)
BD - Brought Down
CO - Carried OutDNF - Did Not FinishF - FellHR - Hit RailsN/R - Non-runnerP or PU - Pulled UpRO - Ran OutR - RefusedRTR - Refused To RaceSU - Slipped UpU or UR - Unseated Rider
Horse Name
Horse's Age
Course/Distance Form
C = course winnerD = distance winnerBF = beaten favourite
Weight 
Days since last ran
If the horse has recently run under a different code (either Flat or Jump)
the days elapsed since that race are shown in brackets.
Headgear
B = blinkers 1st timeb = blinkers, worn before
V = visor 1st timev = visor, worn before
H = hood 1st timeh = hood, worn before
C = eye cover 1st timec = eye cover, worn before
E = eye hood 1st timee = eye hood, worn before
T = tongue strap 1st timet = tongue strap, worn before
Trainer
Jockey
Penalties & Out Of Handicap
ex = penalty for recent win
oh = out of the handicap
Jockey's colours
Owner

References

External links
BBC explanation of a typical racecard

Horse racing terminology